Ruslan Mirzaliyev (born 22 July 1977) is a judoka from Ukraine.

Achievements

References
 

1977 births
Living people
Ukrainian male judoka
Judoka at the 2000 Summer Olympics
Olympic judoka of Ukraine
Ukrainian people of Azerbaijani descent
20th-century Ukrainian people
21st-century Ukrainian people